Rogério Raab Bontorin (born 25 April 1992) is a Brazilian mixed martial artist who competes in the Bantamweight division of Rizin Fighting Federation. A professional since 2013, he most notably fought in the Ultimate Fighting Championship (UFC). He was the formal 57 kg Brazilian Jiu-jitsu Northeast Brazil champion.

Background 
Bontorin, a resident of Colombo, Paraná, Brazil in a family farm where he works. He started his MMA career at the age of 18.

Mixed martial arts career

Early career 
Bontorin made his professional debut in 2013 and fought primarily in his native country Brazil as well as Japanese promotion Pancrase.

Bontorin faced Takeshi Kasugai at Pancrase 283 on 18 December 2016. He missed the contracted weight and went on to win the fight via first-round submission. However, the win was overturned to no contest due to the weight miss.

He amassed a record of 13–1 (1) prior to participated in Dana White's Contender Series.

Dana White Contender Series 
Dawson appeared in Dana White's Contender Series Brazil 1 web-series program. He faced Gustavo Gabriel Silva on 10 August 2018 and won the fight via a submission in round two. With the win, Bontorin was offered a UFC contract.

Ultimate Fighting Championship 
Bontorin made his promotional debut on 2 February 2019 at UFC Fight Night: Assunção vs. Moraes 2, facing Magomed Bibulatov. At the weigh-ins, Bibulatov weighed in at 127 pounds, 1 pound over the flyweight non-title fight limit of 126 and he was fined 20 percent of his purse, which went to Bontorin. He won the fight via unanimous decision.

His next fight came on 10 August 2019 at UFC Fight Night: Shevchenko vs. Carmouche 2 against Raulian Paiva. He won the fight via technical knockout by cutting the eyebrow of Paiva in round one.

On 15 February 2020 Bontorin faced Ray Borg at UFC Fight Night: Anderson vs. Błachowicz 2. At the weigh-ins, Borg failed to make weight, coming in at 128 pounds, two pounds over the flyweight non-title limit of 126 pounds. He was fined 30% of his fight purse, which went to Bontorin and the bout proceeded at a catchweight. He lost the fight via unanimous decision.

Bontorin was scheduled to face Manel Kape on 15 August 2020 at UFC 252. However, Bontorin pulled out of the fight on 22 July due to an ankle injury. Promotion officials tried to find a replacement for Kape but he was eventually removed from the card.

Bontorin faced Kai Kara-France on 6 March 2021 at UFC 259. He lost the fight via knockout in round one.

Bontorin faced Matt Schnell, replacing Alex Perez, on 15 May 2021 at UFC 262. At the weigh ins, Bontorin weighed in at 137 pounds, 1 pound over the bantamweight non-title fight limit. The bout proceeded at catchweight and Bontorin was fined 20% of his individual purse, which went to Schnell. He won the fight via unanimous decision.

In June 2021, Bontorin was flagged by USADA for a potential doping violation. Bontorin tested positive for hydrochlorothiazide, a banned diuretic, in an out-of-competition sample in May 2021.  Bontorin, tested positive for hydrochlorothiazide (HCTZ) as the result of a urine sample collected out-of-competition on 1 May 2021. Following notification of his positive test, Bontorin provided open containers of two dietary supplements he obtained from a Brazilian compounding pharmacy that he was using prior to his positive test for analysis by a WADA-accredited laboratory. Although no prohibited substances were listed on the supplement product labels, the analysis revealed the presence of HCTZ in the products. Bontorin was given a three month suspension that began on 1 May 2021. The result was overturned to a no contest.

Bontorin faced Brandon Royval on 15 January 2022 at UFC on ESPN 32. He lost the fight via split decision.

Bontorin was scheduled to face  Manel Kape on June 11, 2022, at UFC 275. However, the bout was scrapped the day before the event due to Bontorin suffering kidney issues related to cutting weight.

On June 23, 2022, it was announced that Bontorin was released from his contract and no longer on the UFC roster. Bontorin is planning on moving up to Bantamweight.

Rizin FF 
In his first bout post UFC, Bontorin faced Yuki Motoya on December 31, 2022 at Rizin 40. He lost by KO due to a flying knee in the second round.

Mixed martial arts record 

|-
|Loss
|align=center| 16–5 (2)
|Yuki Motoya
|KO (knee)
|Rizin 40
|
|align=center| 2
|align=center| 2:56
|Saitama, Japan
|
|-
|Loss
|align=center|16–4 (2)
|Brandon Royval
|Decision (split)
|UFC on ESPN: Kattar vs. Chikadze
|
|align=center|3
|align=center|5:00
|Las Vegas, Nevada, United States
|
|-
|NC
|align=center|16–3 (2)
|Matt Schnell
|NC (overturned)
|UFC 262
|
|align=center|3
|align=center|5:00
|Houston, Texas, United States
|
|-
|Loss
|align=center|16–3 (1)
|Kai Kara-France
|KO (punches)
|UFC 259
|
|align=center|1
|align=center|4:55
|Las Vegas, Nevada, United States
|
|-
|Loss
|align=center|16–2 (1)
|Ray Borg
|Decision (unanimous)
|UFC Fight Night: Anderson vs. Błachowicz 2
|
|align=center|3
|align=center|5:00
|Rio Rancho, New Mexico, United States
|
|-
|Win
|align=center|16–1 (1)
|Raulian Paiva
|TKO (doctor stoppage)
|UFC Fight Night: Shevchenko vs. Carmouche 2
|
|align=center|1
|align=center|2:56
|Montevideo, Uruguay
|
|-
|Win
|align=center|15–1 (1)
|Magomed Bibulatov
|Decision (split)
|UFC Fight Night: Assunção vs. Moraes 2
|
|align=center|3
|align=center|5:00
|Fortaleza, Brazil
|
|-
|Win
|align=center|14–1 (1)
|Gustavo Gabriel Silva
|Submission (rear-naked choke)
|Dana White's Contender Series Brazil 1
|
|align=center|2
|align=center|2:46
|Las Vegas, Nevada, United States
|
|-
|Win
|align=center|13–1 (1)
|Paulo César Cardoso
|TKO (elbows)
|Imortal FC 8
|
|align=center|3
|align=center|2:46
|São José dos Pinhais, Brazil
|
|-
|Loss
|align=center|12–1 (1)
|Michinori Tanaka
|Submission (rear-naked choke)
|Grandslam 6
|
|align=center|3
|align=center|2:27
|Colombo, Brazil
|
|-
|Win
|align=center|12–0 (1)
|Rildeci Lima Dias
|TKO (punches)
|Katana Fight: Gold Edition
|
|align=center|1
|align=center|0:48
|São José dos Pinhais, Brazil
|
|-
|Win
|align=center|11–0 (1)
|Jon Olivar
|Submission (rear-naked choke)
|Brave 3: Battle in Brazil
|
|align=center|1
|align=center|3:00
|Tokyo, Japan
|
|-
|NC
|align=center|10–0 (1)
|Takeshi Kasugai
|NC (Bontorin missed weight)
|Pancrase - 283
|
|align=center|1
|align=center|2:19
|Tokyo, Japan
|
|-
|Win
|align=center|10–0
|Cristiano Souza
|Submission (armbar)
|rowspan=2|Imortal FC 5
|rowspan=2|
|align=center|1
|align=center|2:05
|rowspan=2|São José dos Pinhais, Brazil
|
|-
|Win
|align=center|9–0
|Ivonei Pridonik
|Submission (armbar)
|align=center|2
|align=center|1:06
|
|-
|Win
|align=center|8–0
|Israel Silva Lima
|Submission (heel hook)
|XFC International 11
|
|align=center|1
|align=center|1:20
|São Paulo, Brazil
|
|-
|Win
|align=center|7–0
|Carlisson Diego Oliveira dos Santos
|Submission (rear-naked choke)
|Curitiba Fight Pro 3
|
|align=center|2
|align=center|4:06
|Curitiba, Brazil
|
|-
|Win
|align=center|6–0
|Genilson Lacerda
|Submission (rear-naked choke)
|Striker's House Cup 38
|
|align=center|1
|align=center|1:27
|Curitiba, Brazil
|
|-
|Win
|align=center|5–0
|Jeferson Guilherme Pereira
|Submission (rear-naked choke)
|Power Fight Extreme 11
|
|align=center|1
|align=center|3:51
|Curitiba, Brazil
|
|-
|Win
|align=center|4–0
|Carlos do Amaral
|Submission (rear-naked choke)
|Curitiba Fight Pro
|
|align=center|1
|align=center|N/A
|Curitiba, Brazil
|
|-
|Win
|align=center|3–0
|Jonathan Inácio
|Decision (unanimous)
|Gladiator Combat Fight 3
|
|align=center|3
|align=center|5:00
|Curitiba, Brazil
|
|-
|Win
|align=center|2–0
|Cleverson Luiz Candido
|Submission (rear-naked choke)
|treme Fisiomaq Combat
|
|align=center|2
|align=center|1:12
|Araucária, Brazil
|
|-
|Win
|align=center|1–0
|Genilson Lacerda
|Submission (rear-naked choke)
|Gladiator Combat Fight
|
|align=center|1
|align=center|4:30
|Curitiba, Brazil
|
|-

See also 
 List of current Rizin FF fighters
 List of male mixed martial artists

References

External links 
  
 

1992 births
Living people
Brazilian male mixed martial artists
Brazilian practitioners of Brazilian jiu-jitsu
Flyweight mixed martial artists
Mixed martial artists utilizing Brazilian jiu-jitsu
Ultimate Fighting Championship male fighters
People awarded a black belt in Brazilian jiu-jitsu
Sportspeople from Pará